Benedikt Benko Vinković (1581 – 2 December 1642) was a Croatian prelate of the Catholic Church who served as the bishop of Pécs (1630-1637) and the bishop of Zagreb (1637-1642).

Early life 

Vinković was born in 1581 in Jastrebarsko (or Jaska). While some contemporary sources say his parents Petar and Magdalena were free peasants, other sources, including Toma Kovačević, claim that they were serfs. During his early years, Vinković was educated by Jesuits in seminaries in Erdelj, Zagreb, and Vienna. In 1606 Vinković became rector of the Ilyrian College in Bologne, and in 1608 he received a PhD in philosophy.

In 1611 Vinković became archdeacon of Čazma, and in 1612 he became archdeacon of Komarnica. In 1619, Vinković served as an envoy of the Croatian Diet sent to the Emperor to discuss Serb-related issues. In 1622, he was appointed as cathedral archdeacon.

Due to Vatican policies on Ottoman-controlled territories in Europe, several Jesuit priests who fluently spoke different Slavic languages were appointed to higher positions in the Catholic church. Vinković was appointed bishop in Ottoman-controlled Pécs in 1630. Aside from his native language, he also used Latin and Hungarian in his correspondences. Vinković was a supporter of Martin Borković's counter-reformation activities in Međimurje.

Activities related to Serbs 

According to Serb historian Slavko Gavrilović, Vinković (and Petar Petretić) wrote numerous inaccurate texts meant to incite hatred against Serbs and Eastern Orthodox Christians, some of which included advice on how to Catholicize the Serbs. Vinković also targeted the bishop of Marča, Maksim Predojević, whom he reported to the Sacred Congregation for the Propagation of the Faith after refusing to support the conversion of the population of his bishopric to Catholicism. 

Vinković estimated the number of Serbs in Slavonia to be about 74,000. In 1640 Vinković requested Predojević's deposition from the Roman Curia in his 1640 letter to the Pope's nuncio in Vienna. Vinković claimed that Predojević was subordinate to him and Vinković expected to receive some income from him. He also intended to appoint Rafael Levaković as bishop of Marča instead of Predojević.

In the same year he reported that Serbs still used the Cyrillic script. In a 1673 letter, Vinković reported that some Serbs from Istria, Senj, and Vinodolski had been converted to Catholicism.

References

Sources

External links 

 Profile, Archdiocese of Zagreb website; accessed 8 January 2017.

Date of birth unknown
1581 births
1642 deaths
Bishops of Pécs
Bishops of Zagreb
Bishops appointed by Pope Urban VIII
17th-century Roman Catholic archbishops in Croatia
17th-century Roman Catholic bishops in Hungary
16th-century Hungarian Jesuits
17th-century Hungarian Jesuits
History of the Serbs of Croatia